Hobart  is a city in, and the county seat of, Kiowa County, Oklahoma, United States. It was named for Garret Hobart, the 24th Vice President of the United States. The population was 3,756 at the 2010 census, a decline of 6.0 percent from the figure of 3,997 in 2000. It is served by Hobart Regional Airport. It also has two museums: the General Tommy Franks Museum and the Kiowa County Museum.

History
The present town of Hobart began almost overnight on August 6, 1901, when lots on the former Kiowa-Apache-Comanche Reservation in southern Oklahoma Territory were put up for sale. It quickly became the residence of 2,936 people, mostly living in tents. Initially, the town was nicknamed "Ragtown." Wooden structures replaced tents as fast as possible. By 1903, Hobart had electric lights, an ice plant, and some large wholesale businesses. It also had a wooden courthouse. It developed into a town whose economy was based on the production of cotton. At statehood in November 1907, Hobart had a population of 3,136.

Hobart's population declined to 2,936 in 1920, but resumed growing for several years afterward. In 1930, the population was 4,982. In 1950, it reached a peak of 5,380. Thereafter, the town population went into a long-term decline that has continued to the present. In the 1950 water supply in the area was improved with a series of reservoirs; the town is connected by aqueduct to Lake Hobart several kilometers to the north.

Geography
Hobart is located at  (35.026276, -99.090876).

Economy
The economy of the area around Hobart was first based on farming, with the major crops being wheat and cotton. Cattle ranching became important later. Hobart is still primarily a farm town. By the 21st century, most of the employed townspeople worked in the education, health and social services industries.

Climate

Demographics

As of the census of 2000, there were 3,997 people, 1,584 households, and 1,031 families residing in the city. The population density was 1,472.9 people per square mile (569.5/km). There were 1,979 housing units at an average density of 729.3 per square mile (282.0/km). The racial makeup of the city was 80.01% White, 8.18% African American, 4.38% Native American, 0.60% Asian, 0.10% Pacific Islander, 3.83% from other races, and 2.90% from two or more races. Hispanic or Latino of any race were 8.91% of the population.

There were 1,584 households, out of which 29.3% had children under the age of 18 living with them, 49.1% were married couples living together, 11.8% had a female householder with no husband present, and 34.9% were non-families. 32.4% of all households were made up of individuals, and 17.7% had someone living alone who was 65 years of age or older. The average household size was 2.37 and the average family size was 2.99.

In the city, the population was spread out, with 25.0% under the age of 18, 8.0% from 18 to 24, 25.7% from 25 to 44, 20.8% from 45 to 64, and 20.4% who were 65 years of age or older. The median age was 39 years. For every 100 females, there were 95.2 males. For every 100 females age 18 and over, there were 89.4 males.

The median income for a household in the city was $25,781, and the median income for a family was $35,313. Males had a median income of $24,821 versus $20,345 for females. The per capita income for the city was $13,729. About 16.4% of families and 20.0% of the population were below the poverty line, including 23.2% of those under age 18 and 15.2% of those age 65 or over.

Historical sites
 
Five of the eight NRHP-listed sites in Kiowa County are located in Hobart:
Downtown Hobart Historic District (roughly bounded by Jefferson St., 3rd, Washington, 4th, and the 200 and 500 blocks of S. Main St.)
Kiowa County Courthouse (in Courthouse Square)
Hobart Public Library (200 S. Main St.)
Hobart Rock Island Depot (518 S. Main St.)

Media
FM Radio

Distant FM Radio

Newspaper
The Hobart Democrat-Chief is Hobart's oldest businesses, established August 1, 1901 and still in operation in 2020. The town has had two other newspapers, the Hobart Daily Chief and the Hobart Republican.

Notable people
Catharine Crozier, organist, born in Hobart in 1914
Clint Lorance, an Army officer convicted of second-degree murder for battlefield deaths and subsequently pardoned, born in Hobart
Jeanetta Calhoun Mish, Oklahoma Poet Laureate, born in Hobart
Alfred P. Slaner, textile executive, raised in Hobart

Adjacent communities

References

External links
 City of Hobart
  Hobart Chamber of Commerce
 Encyclopedia of Oklahoma History and Culture - Hobart
 Oklahoma Digital Maps: Digital Collections of Oklahoma and Indian Territory
 Hobart Democrat-Chief

Cities in Oklahoma
Cities in Kiowa County, Oklahoma
County seats in Oklahoma